Fingask railway station, Fingask Platform railway station or Fingask Halt railway station was situated in the Fingask area of Aberdeenshire, Scotland, on a short branch, known as the Inverury and Old Meldrum Junction Railway, from Inverurie to Old Meldrum. It served Fingask Castle and the surrounding farms, etc., in this rural area.

History
Originally known as "Fingask", it was formally designated "Fingask Platform" from 1907 to 1924 and finally "Fingask Halt" from 1924 to 1931. In 1886 timetable the designation was however "Fingask Platform". It was one of only two intermediate stops on the line.

The station lay at 244 feet above sea level on a section of the single track line, that for down trains presented a climb that was not too challenging, but it was continuous. No signals or sidings were present and a gated minor road crossed the line giving passengers access. The short wooden platform lay on the northern side of the line in front of the Lochter Burn and had just a simple wooden shelter with a window and the name 'Fingask' on the front. A photograph appeared on 26 May 1926 in the Glasgow Bulletin and the articles title read "A Station Without a Staff".

A station had originally been provided at Muirtown where the vice-chairman of the Oldmeldrum Company lived, half a mile away, however by 1866 trains were calling at the new Fingask Station. At first tickets were not issued for the station and passengers from Oldmeldrum had to pay a fare to Inverurie and vice versa.

The line itself remained open to freight until its official closure on 3 January 1966. Nothing now remains of the station and the trackbed is used to the west as a field access.

Previous services
The 1866 timetable records that "Nos.1 and 6 Down and Nos.1, 3 & 6 Up Trains will stop at the platform. Other trains will stop only when a request by Passengers is made to the Guard at the Lethenty or Old Meldrum stations, or when passengers are upon the platform to be taken up." The line had no Sunday services. The last railtour to visit the line was in June 1965 with a two car DMU.

The branchline

References

Notes

Sources
 
 
 McLeish, Duncan (2014). Rails to Banff, Macduff and Oldmeldrum. Pub. GNoSRA. .

External links
 RAILSCOT on Inverury and Old Meldrum Junction Railway 

Disused railway stations in Aberdeenshire
Railway stations in Great Britain opened in 1866
Railway stations in Great Britain closed in 1931
Former Great North of Scotland Railway stations
1866 establishments in Scotland
1931 disestablishments in Scotland